María José Urrutia Sánchez (born 17 December 1993) is a Chilean footballer who plays as a forward for Colo-Colo and the Chile women's national team.

International career
Urrutia represented Chile at the 2010 FIFA U-17 Women's World Cup.

Personal life
Urrutia has a daughter, whom she gave birth in 2014.

References 

1993 births
Living people
Chilean women's footballers
Women's association football forwards
Women's association football midfielders
Club Deportivo Palestino (women) players
Chile women's international footballers
Chilean expatriate women's footballers
Chilean expatriate sportspeople in Brazil
Expatriate women's footballers in Brazil
2019 FIFA Women's World Cup players
Footballers at the 2020 Summer Olympics
Olympic footballers of Chile